David Pereyra (born 8 August 1975) is a Bolivian swimmer. He competed in the men's 100 metre butterfly event at the 1996 Summer Olympics.

References

External links
 

1975 births
Living people
Bolivian male swimmers
Olympic swimmers of Bolivia
Swimmers at the 1996 Summer Olympics
Place of birth missing (living people)
20th-century Bolivian people